Khaty (Xatıı) is a rural locality (a selo), the only inhabited locality, and the administrative center of Megezheksky Rural Okrug of Nyurbinsky District in the Sakha Republic, Russia, located  from Nyurba, the administrative center of the district. Its population as of the 2010 Census was 559, of whom 275 were male and 284 female, down from 661 as recorded during the 2002 Census.

References

Notes

Sources
Official website of the Sakha Republic. Registry of the Administrative-Territorial Divisions of the Sakha Republic. Nyurbinsky District. 

Rural localities in Nyurbinsky District